The Dallas–Fort Worth metroplex has 1.2 million African-Americans, the 2nd-largest metro population of African-Americans in Texas.

In 2007, Black Enterprise magazine ranked Dallas as a "Top 10 city for African-Americans".

History

Freedmen’s Cemetery was established in 1861.

The Hamilton Park neighborhood was one of the first suburbs in Texas built for African Americans in 1953.

In the mid-1800s, lynchings of African Americans took place in Dealey Plaza.

In the late 19th century, there were over 11,000 black people in Dallas.

In the 1990s, the number of African-Americans making annual incomes of $100,000 or more (adjusted to $75,000 as of 1990, from the circa 2005 number) increased by 300%. Around 2005, increasing numbers of African-Americans moved to suburban communities to the north.

In 1995, Dallas elected its first black mayor, Ron Kirk.

The Dallas–Fort Worth metroplex gained approximately 259,000 new African-Americans between 2010 and 2020, or a nearly 27% increase, 10th of U.S. metropolitan statistical areas during that time span. According to the Brookings Institution, in years 2006-2010 the DFW area had an annual average of 7,678 black people migrate into the area, giving it the 4th-highest inward black migration of all U.S. metropolitan areas.

In 2012 Jamie Thompson of D Magazine stated that Dallas "still suffers from an image problem among black professionals who perceive other cities—Atlanta; Chicago; Houston; or Washington, D.C.—as being more appealing and friendly to blacks."

In 2019, Dallas elected its second black mayor, Eric Johnson.

In addition to the New Great Migration, since around 2010, many African Americans have been moving to the metroplex for its affordable cost of living and job opportunities.

Geography
In 1850 there were at least 207 black people in Dallas County, making up less than 10% of the county population. Historically, the black community was strongly concentrated in the inner-city areas of Dallas and Fort Worth but that has slowly changed since the 1980s.

In the northern suburbs, the black population rate has grown 178% since the 1990s. The strongest growth is in the southern suburbs; for example, Cedar Hill was approximately 51.9% black in 2010, after a gain of more than 12,500 new black residents since 2000. The southern suburbs (DeSoto, Duncanville, Lancaster, Cedar Hill) have been noted as the core of the African-American middle class and upper middle class community in the metroplex.

Stop Six is a historically black neighborhood in Fort Worth.

In 2005, Mansfield had 62 households of African-Americans with annual incomes of at least $100,000; there were none in 1990 with the equivalent in 1990 dollars ($75,000). That same year, the median income of African-American households in Rowlett was higher than the overall median income for that city.

Politics and economy

In 1995, the city of Dallas elected its first black mayor Ron Kirk. He held office from 1995 to 2002. In 2019, Dallas elected its second black mayor, Eric Johnson.

Dallas' Black Chamber of Commerce was established in 1926 and is the oldest in the United States. Fort Worth and some surrounding cities also have a black chamber of commerce.

Media

The Dallas Weekly is the largest African-American-centric publication based in the region. The Dallas Examiner is the other widely circulated African-American-centric publication in the metroplex.

Other black newspapers include the Dallas edition of African-American News and Issues, Black Economic Times, Community Quest, The Dallas Post Tribune, LaVita News/The Black Voice in Arlington, Minority Business News, and Minority Opportunity News Gazette.

The Dallas Express was published in the city from 1892 to 1970.

Education

Primary and secondary schools

Segregation era
In the era before the racial integration of schools, Dallas Independent School District had five high schools for blacks: Booker T. Washington, Lincoln, James Madison, and two others for a brief period: Franklin D. Roosevelt, and L. G. Pinkston. Other schools for black children included George Washington Carver Elementary School (in West Dallas), Benjamin Franklin Darrell Elementary School, Frederick Douglass Elementary School, Eagle Ford Elementary School, Joseph J. Rhoads Elementary School, H.S. Thompson Elementary School, Phyllis Wheatley Elementary School, and Colonial School.

9th Ward School was the first secondary school for black children; its name was changed to Dallas Colored High School in 1893, and in 1927 the building was converted to B.F. Darrell Elementary School, named after a principal at Dallas Colored High. The former Dallas Colored transitioned into Booker T. Washington High School, which opened in 1922. Colored School No. 4 became Frederick Douglass Elementary School in 1902. In 1930 Phyllis Wheatley Elementary was built. In 1939 Lincoln High School, the second black high school, opened. Carver Elementary opened in 1954. In 1955, due to the increasing number of black students around Fair Park, the former Lagow Elementary School for white children was converted into the Joseph J. Rhoads Elementary School for black children; it was the first racially converted school in Dallas. In 1956 the former Forest Avenue High School for whites was converted into Madison High for blacks. Colonial School was converted into a school for black children in 1957. Roosevelt opened in 1963.

The Catholic church operated St. Peter's Academy for black children in Dallas.

Carrollton Colored School was the school for black children in the Carrollton-Farmers Branch Independent School District in the segregation era.

Post-segregation
Around 2005 increasing numbers of African-American students attended schools in the Best Southwest area. Wealthier African-American parents often moved to different school districts to get perceived better educations for their children. Around that same time period increasing numbers of wealthier African-American families were sending their children to private schools; in 2001 there were 5,400 black students in the region's private schools.

From 2000 to 2010 the number of black students in Dallas ISD decreased by 20,000. In 2010 that was the lowest in the post-1965 history of DISD. One reason for the decline in the percentage of black students is the move of black people to suburbs; they did so due to a perception that public schools there have a higher quality than those in DISD, as well as general desires for higher quality housing and lower crime environments. Another reason was the growth in charter schools which take students who would otherwise attend DISD schools; in 2010 5,900 black students attending charter schools in the area lived in the DISD boundaries. Other reasons for the decline in the percentage of black students included a perception that DISD has moved its focus away from black students and towards Hispanic students, and the fact that many Hispanics have moved into traditionally black neighborhoods.

Colleges and universities

Paul Quinn College is the only HBCU in the Dallas–Fort Worth metroplex.

In 1961, Bishop College, a black college in Marshall, moved to Dallas but closed in 1988.

In the late 1940s, Texas Vocational School provided black World War II veterans vocational courses.

The University of Texas at Arlington leads Texas in awarding the most bachelor's and master's degrees to African-Americans.

Recreation
The DFW metroplex is also home to one of the largest HBCU football classics in the country with the State Fair Classic.

Dallas Black Restaurant Week promotes and celebrates some black owned restaurants and culinary professionals in the DFW Metroplex.

Dallas Black Pride is the largest black LGBT celebration in Texas.

Notable African-American cultural point of interest includes the African-American Museum of Dallas in Fair Park and the Dallas Black Dance Theatre and The Black Academy of Arts and Letters both in downtown. The South Dallas Cultural Center places a heavy emphasis on supporting and displaying blacks in the performing, literary, and visual arts.  In Fort Worth, The Lenora Roll Heritage Center Museum and National Multicultural Western Heritage Museum houses history highlighting African-American culture primarily in the North Texas region. In Irving, the Jackie Townsell Bear Creek Heritage Center is a museum that tells the story of Bear Creek of West Irving, one of the oldest established black communities in North Texas.

Notable people
Erykah Badu - R&B/soul artist
Chris Bosh - former NBA player
 Juanita Craft - civil rights activist and politician
Kirk Franklin - gospel singer
Bishop T.D. Jakes - gospel preacher
 Eric Johnson - Mayor of Dallas
Jill Marie Jones - actress
 Ron Kirk - Mayor of Dallas
David Mann - actor and singer
Tamela Mann - actress and singer
Deion Sanders - TV personality and former NFL player
 A. Maceo Smith - civil rights activist
Emmitt Smith - TV personality and former NFL player
Spinderella - hip-hop DJ

See also

 History of the African Americans in Texas
 History of African Americans in Houston
 History of African Americans in San Antonio
 History of African Americans in Austin
 Demographics of Dallas–Fort Worth
 History of Mexican Americans in Dallas–Fort Worth
 History of Nigerian Americans in Dallas–Fort Worth
Chinese Americans in Dallas–Fort Worth
Indian Americans in Dallas–Fort Worth

References

Further reading

 Lawe, Thedore M.  "Racial Politics in Dallas in the Twentieth Century," East Texas Historical Journal (2008) 46#2  pp 27-41; online

 Mokuria, Vicki, and Diana White. "Cinder and Soul: The Biography of a Historically Significant African-American School in Dallas, Texas." Journal of Social Studies Education Research 12.1 (2021): 76-94. online

 Phillips, Michael. White metropolis: race, ethnicity, and religion in Dallas, 1841-2001 (University of Texas Press, 2010).

 Selcer, Richard F. A History of Fort Worth in Black & White: 165 Years of African-American Life (University of North Texas Press, 2015). online

 Wilson, William H. Hamilton Park: A Planned Black Community in Dallas (JHU Press, 1998) online.

External links
 Tarrant County Black Historical and Genealogical Society
 "The New Face of Affluence." The Dallas Morning News. – A series of articles about black professionals in DFW

Ethnic groups in the Dallas–Fort Worth metroplex
African-American cultural history
Dallas–Fort Worth metroplex
Dallas-Fort Worth
History of Dallas
African-American history of Texas